Mohammad Kamran Khan is a Pakistani politician who had been a member of the National Assembly of Pakistan from 2008 to 2013.

Political career
He was elected to the National Assembly of Pakistan from Constituency NA-40 (Tribal Area-V) as an independent candidate of in 2008 Pakistani general election. He received 5,894 votes and defeated Abdul Qayyum, a candidate of Pakistan Citizen Movement. He was criticized for his poor performance during his tenure as Member of the National Assembly.

He ran for the seat of the National Assembly from Constituency NA-40 (Tribal Area-V) as an independent candidate of in 2013 Pakistani general election but was unsuccessful. He received 3,259 votes and lost the seat to Muhammad Nazeer Khan.

References

Pakistani MNAs 2008–2013
People from Miranshah
Living people
Year of birth missing (living people)